The Chicago Abortion Fund (known colloquially as CAF) was founded in October 1985 in Chicago, Illinois. Chicago Abortion Fund is a non-profit organization which provides medical referrals and funds to people who are facing barriers in accessing abortion services. The group also may provide logistical, practical, and emotional support as needed and engages in political advocacy work and research in Illinois and beyond. This organization is affiliated with the National Network of Abortion Funds.

History 
The beginning of CAF was a movement and not a hierarchical beginning. Many played integral and supporting roles when the organization first began in 1985.

One such founder is known as Heather Booth, also a founder of the Jane Collective – the women who, before abortion was legal, not only helped women obtain abortions but began to perform the abortions themselves. "Jane" (the Abortion Counseling Service of Women's Liberation) began as an underground referral group. They did this illegal work so that women could have access to reproductive health services. In 1972, following the arrest of seven members of Jane, a defense committee was formed which became the Abortion Task Force (ATF). The charges against the Jane women were dropped following the Roe v. Wade decision in 1973.

In 1973, the Health Evaluation and Referral Services (HERS) was formed, in part, as an outgrowth of the ATF. HERS had been a work group of the Chicago Women's Liberation Union (CWLU). At least one Jane woman had also been a member of the CWLU.

Activism and outreach 
In October 1996, Chicago Abortion Fund formed African American Women Evolving (AAWE). This group was later renamed as Black Women For Reproductive Justice (BWRJ).

In March 2008, Chicago Abortion Fund started a public access television show called The A Word featured on television channel CAN-TV 21 and YouTube. The program's hosts discuss reproductive health and answer questions from viewers.

On January 22, 2009, Chicago Abortion Fund hosted a rally and march celebrating the 36th anniversary of Roe v. Wade. This event took place in Chicago, Illinois, at Federal Plaza. The poster for this event is shown in the photo above.

In March 2011, Chicago Abortion Fund released a public statement against a billboard placed on the south side of Chicago by Life Always. Chicago Abortion Fund's former executive director, Gaylon Alcaraz, appeared on NBC Chicago during a community protest against the billboard.

On April 21, 2012, Chicago Abortion Fund hosted its fourth annual bowl-a-thon event. Proceeds from this event supported the Chicago Abortion Fund.

On May 30, 2012, Gaylon Alcaraz appeared on CAN TV21 to discuss women of color in the reproductive rights movement and answer questions from public viewers. This program was available to television viewers as well as viewers on the internet, who viewed the program via livestream.

On January 19, 2013, Chicago Abortion Fund was mentioned on the television program Melissa Harris-Perry.

On January 22, 2013, Chicago Abortion Fund hosted the celebration Roe v. Wade 40th Anniversary.

On January 22, 2013, Brittany Mostiller and Gaylon Alcaraz were quoted by Ebony magazine. Ms. Mostiller is a former grantee of Chicago Abortion Fund and Ms. Alcaraz is CAF's executive director. The article was titled "Roe v. Wade at 40: What Keeps Black Women from Going Public with Our Stories?"

On January 1, 2015, former deputy director and My Voice, My Choice leadership group member Brittany Mostiller Keith transitioned into her new role as executive director.

See also 
Abortion in Illinois

References 

History of women in Illinois
Abortion-rights organizations in the United States
Women's organizations based in the United States
Organizations established in 1985
1985 establishments in Illinois